Acoyte is a station on Line A of the Buenos Aires Metro. The station was opened on 1 July 1914 as part of the extension of the line from Río de Janeiro to  Primera Junta.

References

External links

Buenos Aires Underground stations
Railway stations opened in 1914
1914 establishments in Argentina